The 1997 Croatian Indoors was a men's tennis tournament played on indoor carpet courts at the Dom Sportova in Zagreb in Croatia and was part of the World Series of the 1997 ATP Tour. It was the second edition of the tournament and took place from January 27 through February 2, 1997. Goran Ivanišević won the singles title.

Finals

Singles

 Goran Ivanišević defeated  Greg Rusedski 7–6(7–4), 4–6, 7–6(8–6)
 It was Ivanišević's 1st title of the year and the 25th of his career.

Doubles

 Saša Hiršzon /  Goran Ivanišević defeated  Brent Haygarth /  Mark Keil 6–4, 6–3
 It was Hirszon's only title of the year and the 2nd of his career. It was Ivanišević's 2nd title of the year and the 26th of his career.

External links
 Official website
 ATP Tournament Profile

Croatian Indoors
Zagreb Indoors
1990s in Zagreb
January 1997 sports events in Europe
February 1997 sports events in Europe
1997 in Croatian tennis